is a railway station on the Aoimori Railway Line is a railway station in the city of Aomori in Aomori Prefecture, Japan, operated by the third sector railway operator Aoimori Railway Company.

Location
Yadamae Station is served by the Aoimori Railway Line, and is 112.7 kilometers from the terminus of the line at Metoki Station.

Surrounding area
Aomori-Higashi High School
Harabetsu Post Office
Aomori city hall Harabetsu branch

Station layout
Yadamae Station has two opposed side platforms, that are connected to the station building by a footbridge. The station is unattended.

Platforms

History
Yadamae Station was opened on 1 November 1986 as a station on the Japan National Railways' (JNR) Tōhoku Main Line. With the privatization of the JNR on 1 April 1987, it came under the operational control of East Japan Railway Company (JR East). On 4 December 2010, the Tōhoku Shinkansen was successfully extended north to Shin-Aomori Station from Hachinohe. As a result of the opening of the bullet train between the two stations, that section of the Tōhoku Main Line including this station was transferred to the Aoimori Railway Company from JR East on the same day.

Services
Yadamae Station is primarily served by trains operating on a local service on the Aoimori Railway Line between Aomori and Hachinohe. Passenger trains serve Yadamae Station over 17 and a half hours a day from 5:54am to 11:39pm. At peak hours between the first train and 9:37am, trains depart from the station roughly every 30 minutes; otherwise trains depart at an approximate hourly basis. In 2018, a daily average of 1,309 passengers boarded trains at Yadamae Station, an increase from the daily average of 913 passengers the station served in 2011, the first year of its ownership by the Aoimori Railway Company. In 2018, the station was the fifth busiest on the Aoimori Railway Line, excluding Aomori and Hachinohe stations. It is the third busiest station along the Aoimori Railway Line in the city of Aomori.

Bus services
Higashi-Kōkō-Mae bus stop
Aomori City Bus
For Aomori Station
For Yada
For Tōbu-Eigyōsho
For Tsukinokidate

See also
List of railway stations in Japan

References

External links

 

Railway stations in Aomori Prefecture
Aoimori Railway Line
Railway stations in Japan opened in 1986
Aomori (city)